Tatiane dos Santos Silveira (born 13 July 1980) is a Brazilian football manager and former player who played as a midfielder.

Career
Born in Porto Alegre, Rio Grande do Sul, Silveira was known as Tati during her playing days, and played as a senior for Internacional. She retired in 2003, and subsequently started coaching.

Silveira was in charge of Porto Alegre's under-17 team, Grêmio, Canoas and  before joining the Brazil under-17 national team in 2016, as an assistant coach. In 2017, she returned to her former side Internacional; initially in charge of the under-17s, she was subsequently named manager of the main squad.

Silveira left Inter in December 2018, despite losing only one match in the entire season, as her contract was due to expire. On 22 January 2019, she was appointed manager of Ferroviária.

In 2019, Silveira led the Guerreiras Grenás to the second Campeonato Brasileiro title of their history, and was also the first woman to win the trophy as manager. On 21 December 2020, she left the club after a reorganization in the women's football structure.

On 28 June 2021, Silveira was appointed manager of Santos, replacing Christiane Lessa. On 8 August of the following year, she was sacked.

Honours

Manager
Ferroviária
Campeonato Brasileiro de Futebol Feminino Série A1: 2019

References

External links
 
 

1980 births
Footballers from Porto Alegre
Living people
Women's association football midfielders
Brazilian women's footballers
Brazilian football managers
Female association football managers
Santos FC (women) managers